Walter Beardsley Tewksbury (March 21, 1876 – April 24, 1968) was an American track and field athlete. At the 1900 Summer Olympics, he won five medals, including two golds.

Biography
Born in Ashley, Pennsylvania, Tewksbury studied for a dental degree at the University of Pennsylvania, graduating in 1899. Running for the university team, he won the IC4A titles in the 110 and 220 y in 1898 and 1899.

After graduating in 1899, he headed for Paris to compete in the Olympic Games. Tewksbury entered in 5 events, but had strong competition, among others from fellow Penn student Alvin Kraenzlein. In the 100 m, Tewksbury equalled the world record in the semi-finals, but placed second in the final to Frank Jarvis. The following day, he took another second place, behind Kraenzlein, in the 60 m, before entering the 400 m hurdles.

At the time, this event had probably never been contested in the United States, but Tewksbury easily beat the local favourite for the 400 m hurdles title. The event was quite different from present day, as the hurdles were actually telephone poles laid over the track, and the final hurdles was a water barrier (like in the steeplechase). In the final of the 200 m hurdles, he placed third (with Kraenzlein the winner). The final of the 200 m was held a week later; in that race Tewksbury won his second individual Olympic gold, finishing immediately ahead of Norman Pritchard of India.

Tewksbury retired from sports to open a dental practice in Tunkhannock, Pennsylvania, in 1913. He died there on April 24, 1968.

References

External links

1876 births
1968 deaths
People from Ashley, Pennsylvania
American male sprinters
American male hurdlers
Olympic gold medalists for the United States in track and field
Olympic silver medalists for the United States in track and field
Olympic bronze medalists for the United States in track and field
Athletes (track and field) at the 1900 Summer Olympics
Medalists at the 1900 Summer Olympics
Track and field athletes from Pennsylvania
Penn Quakers men's track and field athletes